William F. Hoffmann is a physicist in the University of Arizona who was awarded the status of Fellow from the American Physical Society after they were nominated by their Division of Astrophysics in 1997, for his pioneering work in the field of balloon-borne far-infrared astronomy and discovery of far-infrared radiation from Galactic Center; successful construction of the Multi Mirror Telescope (MMT) and application of infrared array technology to astronomy.

References

Fellows of the American Physical Society
American physicists
Living people
University of Arizona faculty
Year of birth missing (living people)